Simon Barrett (born 1978) is an American actor, producer, and screenwriter known for his collaborations with Adam Wingard, including A Horrible Way to Die, V/H/S, V/H/S/2, You're Next, and The Guest.  He is associated with the mumblegore movement and has worked with director Joe Swanberg several times.

Personal life 
Barrett was born in Columbia, Missouri, in 1978.

Career 
Barrett has performed a number of roles in his films.  He attributes this to the low budgets of his early films, in which he and frequent collaborator Adam Wingard were forced to act, as they could not afford to hire anyone else.  Barrett credits his acting with informing his screenwriting.  Although he said in October 2014 that he is too busy writing to direct, Barrett does not discount directing more projects in the future.

Among his early work was writing the 2004 TV film Frankenfish, and collaborating with director Alex Turner as writer on Dead Birds (2004) and Red Sands (2009), period horror films.  He first collaborated with Wingard on A Horrible Way to Die (2010) and continued with You're Next, in which he wrote, produced, and acted.  He co-wrote Autoerotic (2011) with co-directors Wingard and Joe Swanberg.  The three collaborated again the same year on What Fun We Were Having.

In 2012, he wrote a segment in The ABCs of Death for Wingard and joined  V/H/S as a writer, producer, and actor; he returned to the 2013 sequel to write and direct a segment.  Eric England cast Barrett in Contracted (2013) after meeting him and being impressed with his ability to blend into crowds despite his charisma.  Swanberg cast Barrett and Wingard in 24 Exposures (2013) after being inspired by their working relationship and differing personalities.  Also in 2013, Barrett wrote and directed a radio play for Larry Fessenden's Tales from Beyond the Pale.  The Guest (2014) was another collaboration between Wingard and Barrett.  They said the thriller opened up additional doors to them, as they had previously been stereotyped as horror filmmakers.

He wrote the 2016 Wingard-directed horror sequel Blair Witch (formerly The Woods).

In 2014, he was attached to a remake of the Korean thriller I Saw The Devil.

Filmography 

Acting roles

Short films

References

External links 
 

1978 births
Living people
21st-century American male actors
21st-century American screenwriters
Screenwriters from Missouri
Writers from Columbia, Missouri
Film directors from Missouri
Film producers from Missouri
Hickman High School alumni